Ivaylo Naydenov (born 22 March 1998) is a Bulgarian professional footballer who plays as a right back and defensive midfielder for Lokomotiv Sofia.

Naydenov joined Levski Sofia's academy in 2005 and progressed through the youth ranks. He made his senior debut in 2016, at age 18.

Career
On 13 August 2016, Naydenov made his first senior appearance for Levski, replacing Bozhidar Kraev in the last minutes as Levski won 1-0 at home against Ludogorets Razgrad in the A Group. In June 2022, Naydenov joined Lokomotiv Sofia.

International career
Naydenov made his debut for the Bulgarian under-21 team on 22 March 2019 in the starting eleven for the friendly against Northern Ireland U21.

Career statistics

Club

References

External links
 
 Profile at LevskiSofia.info

1998 births
Living people
Footballers from Sofia
Bulgarian footballers
Bulgaria youth international footballers
First Professional Football League (Bulgaria) players
PFC Levski Sofia players
FC Arda Kardzhali players
Association football midfielders